George Edward Holcomb (April 29, 1900 – November 16, 1983) was an American Negro league pitcher in the 1920s.

A native of Elkhorn, West Virginia, Holcomb played for the Detroit Stars in 1923. He died in Cleveland, Ohio in 1983 at age 83.

References

External links
 and Seamheads

1900 births
1983 deaths
Detroit Stars players
Baseball pitchers
Baseball players from West Virginia
People from Elkhorn, West Virginia
20th-century African-American sportspeople